LPR Brakes was a UCI Professional Continental cycling team, registered in Ireland. The team participated in UCI Continental Circuits races and, when selected as a wildcard, UCI ProTour events. The 2007 squad merged with Team 3C Casalinghi Jet Androni Giocattoli. The team was managed by Davide Boifava in the 2007 season but Fabio Bordonali acquired the management in late 2007. Giovanni Fidanza, Mario Manzoni, and Marco Giuseppe Tabai were directeur sportifs. The team folded after the 2009 season.

Major wins 

2004
 Tour du Lac Léman, Dmitri Konyshev
2005
 GP Knorr, Mauro Santambrogio
 Giro del Mendrisiotto, Michele Maccanti
 Stausee Rundfahrt, Danilo Napolitano
 Stage 3 Settimana Internazionale di Coppi e Bartali, Danilo Napolitano
 Stage 5 Settimana Internazionale di Coppi e Bartali, Elio Aggiano
 Route Adélie de Vitré, Daniele Contrini
 Stage 2 Giro del Trentino, Giuseppe Muraglia
 Overall Clasica Alcobendas, Pavel Tonkov
Stage 1, Pavel Tonkov
 Stage 3 Tour de Picardie, Daniele Contrini
 Stage 1 Vuelta a Asturias, Dmitri Konyshev
 Stage 3 Vuelta a Asturias, Mikhaylo Khalilov
  Road Race Championships, Mikhaylo Khalilov
 Stage 3 Brixia Tour, Danilo Napolitano
 Coppa Bernocchi, Danilo Napolitano
 Stages 2 & 5 Tour du Poitou-Charentes, Danilo Napolitano
 Giro della Romagna, Danilo Napolitano
2006
 Stage 7 Tour de Langkawi, Elio Aggiano
 GP Knorr, Giairo Ermeti
 Giro del Mendrisiotto, Daniele De Paoli
 Hel van het Mergelland, Mikhaylo Khalilov
 Stage 2 Tour de Suisse, Daniele Contrini
2007
 Giro del Mendrisiotto, Andreas Dietziker
 Grand Prix Pino Cerami, Luca Solari
 Stage 3 Rheinland-Pfalz Rundfahrt, Luca Celli
 Stage 5 Rheinland-Pfalz Rundfahrt, Andreas Dietziker
 GP Kranj, Borut Božič
 Overall Tour de Wallonie, Borut Božič
 Stage 3 Tour of Ireland, Borut Božič
 Stage 5 Tour of Ireland, Marco Marcato
2008
 Overall Giro della Provincia di Reggio Calabria, Daniele Pietropolli
Stage 3, Daniele Pietropolli
 Stage 2 Tour Ivoirien de la Paix, Sergio Laganà
 Stage 3 Tour Ivoirien de la Paix, Walter Proch
 Overall Settimana Lombarda, Danilo Di Luca
Stage 4, Danilo Di Luca
 Giro d'Oro, Gabriele Bosisio
 Stage 7 Giro d'Italia, Gabriele Bosisio
 Overall Tour of Slovenia, Jure Golčer
Stage 1, Claudio Cucinotta
Stage 3, Jure Golčer
  Road Race Championships, Ruslan Pidgornyy
 Stage 3 Tour of Austria, Ruslan Pidgornyy
 Stage 3 Brixia Tour, Gabriele Bosisio
 Stages 1, 6 & 8 Tour of Britain, Alessandro Petacchi
 Memorial Viviana Manservisi, Alessandro Petacchi
 Giro dell'Emilia, Danilo Di Luca
 Gran Premio Bruno Beghelli, Alessandro Petacchi
2009
 Gran Premio della Costa Etruschi, Alessandro Petacchi
 Overall Giro della Provincia di Grosseto, Daniele Pietropolli
Stage 3, Daniele Pietropolli
 Stage 5 Giro di Sardegna, Alessandro Petacchi
 Stage 2 Tirreno–Adriatico, Alessandro Petacchi
Overall Settimana Lombarda, Daniele Pietropolli
Stage 1, Team Time Trial
Stages 2 & 4, Alessandro Petacchi
 Scheldeprijs, Alessandro Petacchi
 Stage 4 Giro del Trentino, Danilo Di Luca
 Giro di Toscana, Alessandro Petacchi
 Stages 2 & 3 Giro d'Italia, Alessandro Petacchi
 Memorial Marco Pantani, Roberto Ferrari
 Stage 1 Delta Tour Zeeland, Alessandro Petacchi

2009 Team
As of 31 December 2009.

References

External links

Defunct cycling teams based in Ireland
Cycling teams established in 2004
Cycling teams disestablished in 2009
2004 establishments in Switzerland
2009 disestablishments in Ireland
Defunct cycling teams based in Switzerland